Rauhes Haus is a metro station on the Hamburg U-Bahn lines U2 and U4. The station was opened in January 1967 and is located in the Hamburg district of Hamm, Germany. Hamm is part of the borough of Hamburg-Mitte. The station is named after the nearby 'Rauhes Haus'.

Service

Trains 
Rauhes Haus is served by Hamburg U-Bahn lines U2 and U4; departures are every 5 minutes.

See also 

 List of Hamburg U-Bahn stations

References

External links 

 Line and route network plans at hvv.de 

Hamburg U-Bahn stations in Hamburg
U2 (Hamburg U-Bahn) stations
U4 (Hamburg U-Bahn) stations
Buildings and structures in Hamburg-Mitte
Railway stations in Germany opened in 1967
1967 establishments in West Germany